Jamie Rappaport Clark (born 1957 or 1958) is an American conservationist and former government official working as the president and CEO of Defenders of Wildlife. She joined the organization as executive vice president in 2004.

Early life and education
Born in New York city, Clark attended Towson State University, earning a B.S. in wildlife biology in 1979. She received an M.S. in wildlife ecology from the University of Maryland, College Park.

Career
Clark has been a lifelong participant in the conservation of wildlife. As a college student, she spent a summer at Aberdeen Proving Grounds, where she released peregrine falcons back into the wild as part of a national recovery effort. Twenty years later, as the director of the United States Fish and Wildlife Service, she officially removed them from the federal list of endangered species due to the successful recovery efforts, in which she participated.

Clark has a long career in conservation, both inside the government, mostly with the U.S. Fish and Wildlife Service, and with non-profit conservation organizations.

In recognition of her expertise and achievements in endangered species conservation, President Bill Clinton appointed her as Director of the United States Fish and Wildlife Service (the Service) in 1997, a post which she held until 2001. During her tenure as director, Clark established 27 new refuges and added two million acres to the National Wildlife Refuge System. While director, the Service worked with Congress to pass the National Wildlife Refuge System Improvements Act of 1997 , establishing wildlife conservation as the main purpose of all refuges. The Service was involved in many successful efforts to recover imperiled wildlife during her tenure, including the bald eagle, gray wolf and the Aleutian Canada goose.

As president and CEO of Defenders of Wildlife, Clark has been at the forefront of endangered species and habitat conservation in the non-profit community. She has been frequently called on to testify on Capitol Hill, providing guidance to members of Congress on conservation issues. Under her tenure, Defenders has played a key role in the reintroduction of bison to tribal reservations, secured protections for right whales, sea turtles and piping plovers and many other species and habitats. Workers at Defenders credit Clark with creating a toxic work environment and a "culture of fear" surrounding a 2021 effort to unionize the organization.

Honors and awards
In 2017 she was awarded the Rachel Carson Award by the Audubon Society for her life's work.

Works 
 Schlyer, Krista. Continental Divide: Wildlife, People and the Border Wall. Texas A&M University Press. Foreword by Jamie Rappaport Clark.
 Huffington Post Blog – Jamie Rappaport Clark
 Speeches and articles

References

External links
 C-SPAN 1997–present: Jamie Rappaport Clark testifying on Capitol Hill
 Defenders of Wildlife
 Endangered Species Act

1950s births
Year of birth missing (living people)
Living people
United States Fish and Wildlife Service personnel
American nonprofit chief executives
American women chief executives
Towson University alumni
University of Maryland, College Park alumni
Activists from New York City
21st-century American women